Yair Golan (Hebrew: יָאִיר גּוֹלָן; born May 14, 1962) is an Israeli politician. He served as the Deputy Minister of Economy in the Thirty-sixth Israeli government, and served as a Member of the Knesset representing Meretz in 2019-2022. He is a reserved major general (Aluf) in the Israel Defense Forces. During his military service he served, among other roles, as the IDF Deputy Chief of Staff, Commander of the Home Front Command and Commander of the Northern Command.

Biography

Early life 
Golan was born and grew up in Rishon LeZion. His father, Gershon Goldner, fled with his parents to Palestine from Nazi Germany in 1935. His father served in the IDF and his last role was a senior technical assistant to the chief communications and electronics officer at the rank of lieutenant colonel (Sgan Aluf). His mother, Rachel, was born in Tel Aviv In the family of Aryeh Rapoport who immigrated in 1921 from Ukraine  and Hana, born in Nachelat Yehuda. His elder brother is a professor in the University of Haifa and his little sister is a special-ed teacher in the Shamir Medical Center.

Studied at Haviv Elementary School and "Yadlin" School in Rishon LeZion and Ort Singalovsky School in Tel Aviv.

Golan was the head of the "nest council" of Rishon LeZion in the leftist Labour Zionist youth movement The Working and Studying Youth

Military service 

Golan was drafted into the IDF in 1980. After passing the pilot course tests, he decided to follow his brother's steps and volunteer for the paratrooper brigade instead. He served as a soldier and a squad leader  and fought in the 1982 Lebanon War. After completing Officer Candidate School he became an infantry officer and returned to the Paratroopers Brigade as a platoon leader. Golan served as the commander of the Brigade's Anti-tank company and led the 890 Paratroop Battalion in counter-guerrilla operations in the South Lebanon conflict and in the First Intifada. In 1993 he served as a Battalion Commander in IDF Officers' School and afterwards served as Judea and Samaria Division's Operations Branch Officer. Between the years 1996–1997 he Commanded the Eastern brigade of Lebanon Liaison Unit and was injured in an encounter with a squad of Hezbollah militants. Afterwards he served as the head of the Operations section in the Operations Directorate. During the Second Intifada, Golan commanded the Nahal Infantry Brigade. Afterwards he commanded the 91st Division and the Judea and Samaria Division. In the years 2008-2011 Golan served as the Commander of Home Front Command, which he led through Operation Cast Lead. In July 2011 he served as the Commander of Israeli Northern Command, and in December 2014 as Deputy Chief of General Staff. Golan was replaced by Aluf Aviv Kochavi in May 2017  and retired from active service in march 2018.

Awards and decorations 
Yair Golan was awarded 4 campaign ribbons

Political life

On 26 June 2019, Ehud Barak announced that Golan will join him in forming a new party called Israel Democratic Party which intented on challenging Netanyahu in the upcoming September 2019 Israeli legislative election. The party later joined the Democratic Union alliance to contest the September election. Golan was placed 3rd on the list and served as a Member of the twenty-second Knesset.

He re-activated the Democratic Choice party in January 2020, becoming its leader and joining the Democratic Union again in advance of the 2020 Israeli legislative election. In December 2020, Golan announced his accession to Meretz, and was elected to the twenty-fourth Knesset. He was appointed Deputy Minister of Economy under Orna Barbivai. 

On July 6, 2022, he announced his candidacy for the leadership of the Meretz party ahead of the elections for the twenty-fifth Knesset. He lost to Zehava Gal-On, but was elected fourth in the list elections and placed fifth. He has represented Meretz in the Knesset until the party failed to pass the electoral threshold in the 2022 legislative elections.

Controversies

Holocaust Day speech 
As Deputy Chief of Staff, Golan made a speech on Holocaust Day in 2016 in which some say he drew a parallel between Europe in general and Germany in particular in the 1930s and current day Israel, by saying "If there is one thing that is scary in remembering the Holocaust, it is noticing horrific processes which developed in Europe – particularly in Germany – 70, 80, and 90 years ago, and finding remnants of that here (in Israel) among us in the year 2016." He said that sometimes Israeli soldiers were harsh in dealing with Palestinians, and he highlighted the example of Sergeant Elor Azaria being tried over a Hebron shooting incident as evidence that the IDF investigates itself and has high moral standards. His comments drew significant criticism on social media, with Twitter users accusing Golan of "forgetting the lessons of the Holocaust." Israeli Prime Minister Benjamin Netanyahu called the comments "outrageous" and said they "do injustice to Israeli society and create contempt for the Holocaust." Culture Minister Miri Regev called for his resignation, while opposition leader Isaac Herzog praised Golan for exhibiting "morality and responsibility."

Later, Golan retracted and said that he did not intend to compare Israel to Nazi Germany, releasing a statement in which he said "It is an absurd and baseless comparison and I had no intention whatsoever to draw any sort of parallel or to criticize the national leadership. The IDF is a moral army that respects the rules of engagement and protects human dignity."

In 2022 Golan stated that this incident is the reason he didn't become Chief of Staff of the IDF, though he still agrees with his statements.

Homesh incident 
Homesh was an Israeli settlement that was evicted in the 2005 disengagement, but since then had constant illegal attempts to resettle it, and is a source of protest and violence in the West Bank.

On December 16, 2021, Yehudah Dimentman, a resident of the nearby settlement, Shavei Shomron who was a student at the Homesh outpost yeshiva, was killed by a Palestinian shooter. In response to the attack, Homesh settlers attacked a man from the village of Burqa, damaged houses and desecrated graves. Golan said that: "Those people who come to settle there, riot in Burqa, destroy gravestones, committed a pogrom. Do we abuse gravestones? These are not people, these are subhumans, despicable people, the corruption of the Jewish people." The use of the phrase "subhuman" provoked a lot of criticism, and Golan said it was an "unsuccessful expression".

In 2023 as a response to the Huwara rampage, Golan wrote on Twitter  "They used to get angry with me when I said these people were subhuman. Today they are angry that I didn't say more."

Use of human shields 
On October 18, 2007, the IDF Chief of Staff initiated a disciplinary proceeding against then Brig. Gen. (Tat Aluf) Yair Golan, after a Military Police investigation into several cases where Golan used the "prior warning" procedure, which allowed IDF soldiers to use a relative or neighbor of a wanted person and force them to enter their house and ask them to turn themselves in. This procedure was outlawed by the Supreme Court in 2006, a decision that was also adopted by the IDF.

On July 31, 2022, in an interview, Golan stated: The way I used the procedure reduced the danger posed on the IDF soldiers drastically, and I avoided confrontations that could've ended in the death of many Palestinians.

Political Views 
Yair Golan defines himself as a Leftist Zionist. When asked what event made Golan consider joining the Israeli political life, He said "in the 2015-2016 wave of violence and terror I saw many incidents where soldiers use lethal force and kill in incidents that are.. not dramatic. Things that I personally went through a lot during my military service. So I asked to get the data on every Palestinian killed by the IDF, and I saw each incident and said: Wait, this is not how a soldier acts! and all of that gave me the feeling that something has gone wrong for us (Israeli society). First of all, something went wrong with the Israeli leadership, and that disrupts the mind of the Israeli society. And this process of extremism, with no ability to see the other side, even the enemy, as a human being, is a dangerous and destructive thing, for soldiers too.

Golan believes that Meretz and Ha'avoda should merge into one large Leftist Zionist party and that both parties have ended their historical roles, and must rebrand themselves to be saved.

Golan has stated that he will fight against "corruption, the annexation of the West Bank, homophobia, and gender segregation."

On climate activism, Golan twitted "Israel's influence on the climate crisis is negligible. The preoccupation with the climate in Israel should be in the preparation of infrastructure for extreme heat waves and the protection of our nature reserves. Talking about climate as if Israel is a power, is talking in slogans instead of doing actions that directly affect the Israeli citizen."

Golan has called on numerus occasions for the Israeli public to start "non-violent civil disobedience" (מרי אזרחי) in response to the 2023 Israeli judicial reform and the Thirty-seventh government of Israel.

Israeli-Palestinian conflict 
Golan supports the Two States Solution based on land swaps and the keeping of most Settlement blocs.

In a 2022 Interview to Kan 11 Golan said "We need to go to the base. To go back to (the way of) Ben-Gurion, Rabin, Begin and Sharon. We need to disengage, we need to say: Yes, we would've liked all of Eretz Israel, as it's the land of our ancestors, but we have no choice. To keep the unity of the nation, we must give up on the unity of the land. I don't see any other chance for the State of Israel."  

Golan supports economic incentives in order to stabilize the hostilities in Gaza and to use military force if needed. Golan supports the 2005 Israeli Disengagement from Gaza to this day.

Though there are conflicting statements, in the latest interviews Golan has stated that the IDF is an "Occupying military" but believes it is justified until peace is achieved.

He has made statements against the BDS movement and in his opinion, it has anti-Semitic overtones, and that Israel has to "fight it to the bitter end."

Religion and state 
Golan believes in complete separation of state and religion including the end of the "marriage monopoly" in Israel, allowing LGBT+ marriage and public transportation on Shabbat.

In several interviews and statements, Golan heavily criticized the lack of education in Haredi schools.

Economy 
Golan stated that he believes in "An economy that creates equal opportunities, that allows every young man and woman an open horizon thanks to proper education and proper infrastructure in the center and the periphery."

Personal life and education 
Golan holds a bachelor's degree in political science from Tel Aviv University, and a master's degree in public administration policy from Harvard University in the United States (joint program of the Wexner Foundation and the Kennedy School of Government).

He is a father to five children and resides in Rosh HaAyin.

References

External links

1962 births
Living people
20th-century Israeli military personnel
21st-century Israeli military personnel
Israeli generals
Israeli Jews
Israeli people of German-Jewish descent
Jewish Israeli politicians
Jewish military personnel
Members of the 22nd Knesset (2019–2020)
Members of the 23rd Knesset (2020–2021)
Members of the 24th Knesset (2021–2022)
Meretz politicians
People from Rishon LeZion
Tel Aviv University alumni
Harvard Kennedy School alumni